Punkara is the sixth studio album by the collective Asian Dub Foundation. It was recorded with The Go! Team producer, Gareth Parton at The Fortress Studios, London. It is the first album released with new singer Al Rumjen formerly of King Prawn. There was an advanced release in Japan on 26 March 2008, and it was subsequently leaked worldwide. Punkara was released in the UK on the 13 October 2008 with a different track listing to the Japanese release which featured an exclusive bonus track. A video has been released for Burning Fence, the song appears in the video game Need for Speed: Undercover

Track listing

Critical reception
AllMusic was generally positive about the album but noted it broke little new ground.

References

External links
Official Band Website

Naïve Records albums
2008 albums
Asian Dub Foundation albums